Cassius Clay (soon Muhammad Ali) fought a ten-round boxing match with Tony Esperti in Miami on January 17, 1961. Clay won the bout through a technical knockout when the referee stopped the fight in the third round after Esparti's left eye had been cut by Clay's jabs. Esperti was later convicted of first degree murder for gunning down mafia boss Thomas Altamura, a member of the Gambino crime family.

References

Esperti
1961 in boxing
January 1961 sports events in the United States